Kabiru Rabiu (born 28 November 1980) is a Nigerian entrepreneur and currently serves as the group executive director of BUA Group. In 2020, he was named the best African economic leader under the age of 40 in the 100 African Economic Leaders for Tomorrow awards by the French Institut Choiseu.

Education and career 
Rabiu received a bachelor's degree in management from Webster University, London and had his master's degree from the American Intercontinental University in London. Rabiu started his career with Universal Rice Mills and later joined the Nigeria Oil Mills Limited where he served as the Assistant General Manager and later became the General Manager. In 2008, he became the executive director of the BUA Oil Mills Limited. In 2010, he became the executive director of BUA Group. Kabiru is the founder of Hollaport (a payment and messaging application).

References 

1980 births
Living people
21st-century Nigerian businesspeople
Webster University alumni
American InterContinental University alumni